Oddibe McDowell (born August 25, 1962) is an American former center fielder in Major League Baseball (MLB) who played from 1985 to 1994 for the Texas Rangers, Cleveland Indians, and Atlanta Braves.

His first name is pronounced "owed a bee" or "oh-ta-bee." Because it also sounds vaguely like a slurred rendition of "oh to be", ESPN personality and announcer Chris Berman dubbed him Oddibe "Young Again" McDowell.

Amateur baseball
McDowell was a noted multi-sport athlete at McArthur High School in Hollywood, Florida, and won the Florida High School Activities Association Class 4A wrestling championship at 155 pounds in 1979.

McDowell won the Golden Spikes Award, which is given annually to the best amateur baseball player, in 1984 while playing college baseball at Arizona State University (ASU). He wore uniform number 0 at ASU; ASU inducted McDowell to the university's athletic hall of fame in 1991 and has retired his number.

In 1981, McDowell won a gold medal as a member of the United States national team in World Games I. He was also a member of the 1984 United States Olympic Team.

McDowell was selected by the Texas Rangers in the first round of the 1984 Major League Baseball draft.

Professional baseball
McDowell stood out during his first stint with the Texas Rangers by wearing the very unusual uniform number 0. He wore the number 20 with the Indians, the number 1 with the Braves, and during his second time with the Rangers, he wore number 8.

McDowell was the first player to hit for the cycle for the Rangers, doing so on July 23, 1985, in a Rangers' 8–4 victory over the Indians at Arlington Stadium. Through the end of the 2017 season, Mark Teixeira, Gary Matthews, Jr., Ian Kinsler, Bengie Molina, Adrián Beltré, Alex Ríos, Shin-Soo Choo, and Carlos Gomez are the other Rangers players to hit for the cycle. McDowell finished 4th in the American League Rookie of the Year voting for 1985.

Through June 16, 2009, McDowell was tied for second of all Rangers players ever in career leadoff home runs, one behind the nine leadoff homers by Ian Kinsler.

Post-playing career
McDowell was inducted to the National College Baseball Hall of Fame in 2011.

Between February 2011 and March 2012, Deadspin ran a series of 14 articles, which published McDowell's monthly water bill and the amount owed; until that time, water bills were publicly accessible on the Broward County Waste and Wastewater Services department's website. Writing for New Times Broward-Palm Beach, Michael J. Mooney described the series as Dadaist and evidence of "the power of mass appeal and of interactive media."

As of 2022, McDowell is in his eighth year as the head coach for the McArthur High School varsity baseball team in Hollywood, Florida.

See also
 List of Major League Baseball career stolen bases leaders
 List of Major League Baseball players to hit for the cycle

References

External links
 , or Retrosheet

1962 births
Living people
African-American baseball coaches
African-American baseball players
All-American college baseball players
American expatriate baseball players in Canada
Arizona State Sun Devils baseball players
Atlanta Braves players
Baseball coaches from Florida
Baseball players at the 1984 Summer Olympics
Baseball players from Florida
Cleveland Indians players
Columbus Clippers players
Competitors at the 1981 World Games
Edmonton Trappers players
Golden Spikes Award winners
Major League Baseball center fielders
Medalists at the 1984 Summer Olympics
Texas Rangers players
Oklahoma City 89ers players
Olympic silver medalists for the United States in baseball
Rochester Red Wings players
Sportspeople from Hollywood, Florida
Tulsa Drillers players
World Games gold medalists
21st-century African-American people
20th-century African-American sportspeople
National College Baseball Hall of Fame inductees
Alaska Goldpanners of Fairbanks players